Ruslan Ihorovych Pisnyi (born 15 May 1997) is a Ukrainian professional footballer who plays as a right back for Ukrainian club Alians Lypova Dolyna.

References

External links
 Profile on Alians Lypova Dolyna official website
 
 

1997 births
Living people
Sportspeople from Sumy
Ukrainian footballers
Association football defenders
FC Barsa Sumy players
PFC Sumy players
FC Sumy players
FC Alians Lypova Dolyna players
Ukrainian First League players
Ukrainian Second League players
Ukrainian Amateur Football Championship players